The pataria was an eleventh-century movement focused on the city of Milan in northern Italy, which aimed to reform the clergy and ecclesiastic government within the city and its ecclesiastical province, in support of papal sanctions against simony and clerical marriage. Those involved in the movement were called patarini  (singular patarino), patarines or patarenes, a word chosen by their opponents, the etymology of which is unclear. The movement, associated with urban unrest in the city of Milan, is generally considered to have begun in 1057 and ended in 1075.

The Pataria also came to oppose the power of the papacy and its moral corruptions. The Patarines were declared a heretical sect. They are considered by some as a precursor to the Protestant Reformation.

History
Early in the year 1057, a preacher named Ariald arrived in the city of Milan and began to preach against the Milanese clerics' custom of marrying. It is possible that he took advantage of the absence at this time of the Archbishop of Milan, Guido da Velate, who was in Germany in August at the Council of Tribur.

The Milanese clergy grew concerned by Ariald's attempt to whip up the city against them, and sent envoys to Pope Stephen IX in Rome. On hearing this, Ariald travelled to Rome himself. Pope Stephen IX was sympathetic to Ariald's position, and sent two envoys to Milan, Hildebrand of Sovana (later Pope Gregory VII) and Anselm of Baggio (later Pope Alexander II). Ariald also returned to Milan, and now began to criticise the Milanese clerics' practice of simony, resulting in urban unrest. Ariald's close associate Landulf Cotta was attacked, and later died from his injuries.

In 1059 Ariald travelled to Rome again to seek advice; Pope Stephen IX again sent envoys to Milan, this time Peter Damian and again Anselm of Baggio, but this did nothing to quell the unrest in the city. In 1063, Landulf Cotta's brother Erlembald went to Rome where he obtained a papal banner from the newly elected Pope Alexander II in support of the Pataria movement. In 1066, Pope Alexander II finally excommunicated Archbishop Guido. Guido used this excommunication however to whip up the citizens' anger against the Paterenes at a public meeting, and Ariald was first chased out of the city of Milan, and then assassinated, in June 1066.

However, when Ariald's body was found in May 1067, it quickly became the object of a cult, and popular opinion in Milan swung back behind the Pataria. Archbishop Guido was forced out of the city, leaving it under the control of Erlembald, and Alexander II formally proclaimed Ariald to be a saint in 1068.

Archbishop Guido resigned in 1068, in favour of his associate Gotofredo da Castiglione, who was also supported by Emperor Henry IV.  The papacy and the Pataria however supported a different candidate as archbishop, Attone, and Pope Gregory VII excommunicated Gotofredo in 1074.

Rioting in Milan led to the murder of Erlembald in 1075, and after this point the Pataria movement lost much of its energy. The controversy over the appointment of the archbishop of Milan continued, however, and contributed to the political tensions between Emperor Henry IV and Pope Gregory VII.

Medieval historiography 
There are several contemporary and nearly-contemporary sources for the Pataria, each of which offers different and sometimes contradictory perspectives. These include:

Andrew of Strumi's Life of Saint Ariald
Bonizo of Sutri's Liber ad amicum
Arnulf of Milan's Deeds of the Archbishops of Milan
Landulf Senior's History of Milan

Modern historiography 
As Paolo Golinelli has emphasised, modern debates about the Pataria have often centred on whether the Pataria was primarily a religious movement, or whether it was instead the religious expression of social tensions within the city and region of Milan. The Italian historian Gioacchino Volpe, for instance, argued in 1907 that the Pataria was a class conflict between the elites of Milan and the lower-status population. This interpretation was also supported by Ernst Werner in 1956. For Hagen Keller, the Pataria is best understood as part of the history of the emergence of the Italian commune.

More recently, historians such as Herbert Cowdrey have emphasised the movement's essentially religious nature. Many historians have associated the movement with wider reforming trends in the Church. For William North, the Pataria was 'the longest... and most violent of the popular responses to the call for ecclesiastical reform in the eleventh century'. In his article on religious change in the eleventh century, R.I. Moore discussed the Pataria extensively as a major part of the 'appearance of the crowd on the stage of public events', which he sees as being brought into being by religious reform (itself however a response to social change).

In a recent article, Piroska Nagy has suggested a new path of interpretation by analysing the collective emotions of the movement.

Name 
The name Pataria likely comes from the members of the movement assembling in Pataria or ragmen’s quarter of the city (pates is a dialectal word for “rag”), however the name was appropriated by Cathars who claimed it means "to suffer", as to say they suffered for their faith.

References

Further reading

Jordan, K. "Pataria" in Religion in Geschichte und Gegenwart. V, 3.A., 150f.
Coleman, Edward. “Representative Assemblies in Communal Italy”, in P.S. Barnwell & Marco Mostert (eds.), Political Assemblies in the Early Middle Ages. Turnhout, 2003. 193-210
Cowdrey, H. E. J. “Archbishop Aribert of Milan”, History 51, 1966. 1-15
Cowdrey, H. E. J. “The Papacy, the Patarenes and the Church of Milan”, Transactions of Royal Historical Society, 5th series, vol. 18, 1968. 25-48
Cushing, Kathleen G. “Events That Led to Sainthood: Sanctity and the Reformers in the Eleventh Century”, in Richard Gameson & Henrietta Leyser (eds.), Belief and Culture in the Middle Ages. Oxford & New York, 2001. 187-96
Patschovsky, Alexander. “Heresy & Society: On the Political Function of Heresy in the Medieval World”, in Caterina Bruschi & Peter Biller (eds.), Texts and the Repression of Medieval Heresy. 23-41
Siegel, Arthur. “Italian Society and the Origins of Eleventh-Century Western Heresy”, in Michael Frassetto (ed.), Heresy and the Persecuting Society in the Middle Ages: Essays on the Work of R.I. Moore. Leiden, 2006. 43-72
Stock, Brian. The Implications of Literacy: Written Languages and Models of Interpretation in the Eleventh and Twelfth Centuries. Princeton, 1983

11th century in Italy
History of Milan